Majdan  is a mountain peak forming part of the Kopaonik mountain range in Kosovo. Majdan reaches a top height of 1,246m and is located a few kilometres north-east of the city of Kosovska Mitrovica. The Ibar River flows on the western side of the mountain. Beowulf Mining drills the peak.

References

Mountains of Kosovo
Kopaonik
Mitrovica, Kosovo